Calliostoma rubroscalptum is a species of sea snail, a marine gastropod mollusk in the family Calliostomatidae.

Description
The size of the shell varies between 10 mm and 17 mm.

Distribution
This marine species occurs off Taiwan.

References

External links

rubroscalptum
Gastropods described in 1998
Molluscs of the Pacific Ocean